James Matheson (born 10 April 1995) is an Australian freestyle skier. He competed in the 2018 Winter Olympics.

References

1995 births
Living people
Freestyle skiers at the 2018 Winter Olympics
Freestyle skiers at the 2022 Winter Olympics
Australian male freestyle skiers
Olympic freestyle skiers of Australia